The Cartel of the Suns is a Venezuelan organization supposedly headed by high-ranking members of the Armed Forces of Venezuela who are involved in international drug trade. According to Héctor Landaeta, journalist and author of Chavismo, Narco-trafficking and the Military, the phenomenon began when Colombian drugs began to enter into Venezuela from corrupt border units and the "rot moved its way up the ranks."

History

Reports that members of the Venezuelan military were involved in drug trafficking began in the 1990s, though it was limited to taking payments and ignoring drug traffickers. It was alleged that officers of Hugo Chávez's Revolutionary Bolivarian Movement-200 that planned the 1992 Venezuelan coup d'état attempts had created a group that participated in drug trafficking that was known as the "Cartel Bolivariano" or "Bolivarian Cartel". Following the 1992 coup attempts, the Los Angeles Times noted that Venezuelan officers may have sought to take over the government since there was "money to be made from corruption, particularly in drugs".

In 1993, the term "Cartel de los Soles" or "Cartel of the Suns" was first used when allegations of two National Guard generals of the Anti-Drug National Command, Ramón Guillén Dávila and Orlando Hernández Villegas, were investigated for drug trafficking crimes. The term came from the general emblems that looked like suns on their uniforms.

Bolivarian government
The "Cartel of the Suns" name returned in 2004 by reporter and city council member Mauro Marcano. Shortly before he was murdered, Marcano alleged that Alexis Maneiro, head of the National Guard and the Dirección General de Inteligencia Militar, was involved in drug trafficking.

According to Vice News, the Venezuelan government under Hugo Chavez expanded corruption to "unprecedented levels" in an already corrupt military. Chavez gave military officials millions of dollars for social programs that allegedly disappeared, also giving legal immunity to drug trafficking officials to maintain power and loyalty. When Chavez ousted the United States Drug Enforcement Administration in 2005, Venezuela became a more attractive route for drug trade. According to Colombian intelligence, an arrested drug vigilante stated that "senior figures in President Hugo Chavez's security forces to arrange drug shipments through Venezuela".  It has been alleged that the National Guard had worked with the FARC with drug trade. British officials alleged that planes from Colombia would also be sheltered by Venezuelan Air Force bases.

Incidents
In September 2013, an incident allegedly linked to the Cartel of the Suns and involving men from the Venezuelan National Guard who placed 31 suitcases containing 1.3 tons of cocaine on an Air France flight astonished Charles de Gaulle Airport authorities as it was the largest seizure of cocaine recorded in mainland France. On 15 February 2014, a commander for the Venezuelan National Guard was stopped while driving to Valencia with his family and was arrested for having 554 kilos of cocaine in his possession. On 11 November 2015, DEA agents arrested in Haiti two relatives (an adopted son and a nephew) of Cilia Flores, the First Lady of Venezuela, while trying to move 800 kilograms of cocaine from Venezuela to the United States. A source from the DEA unofficially stated, that the large amounts of cocaine are able to pass through Venezuela due to corruption in the government.

Organization
There are groups within the branches of the Armed Forces of Venezuela such as the Venezuelan Army, Venezuelan Navy, Venezuelan Air Force, and Venezuelan National Guard; from the lowest to the highest levels of personnel.

Low-level personnel
Allegedly, lower ranking National Guardsmen compete for positions at border checkpoints so they can be paid bribes for "illicit trade", though a large portion of bribes go to their superiors. Allegedly, the corrupt officials of the Cartel of the Suns traffic drugs from Colombia to Venezuela where they are shipped internationally.

High-level officials

Nicolás Maduro 
President of Venezuela Nicolás Maduro has personally promoted individuals accused of drug trafficking to high positions of the Venezuelan government. In May 2018, he was said to have received drug trafficking profits from Diosdado Cabello.

Diosdado Cabello
In January 2015, the former security chief of both Hugo Chavez and Diosdado Cabello, Leamsy Salazar, made accusations that Cabello was head of the Cartel of the Suns. Salazar was placed in witness protection, fleeing to the United States with assistance of the Drug Enforcement Administration's Special Operations Division after cooperating with the administration and providing possible details on Cabello's involvement with international drug trade. Salazar stated that he saw Cabello give orders on transporting tons of cocaine. The shipments of drugs were reportedly sent from the FARC in Colombia to the United States and Europe, with the possible assistance of Cuba. The alleged international drug operation had possibly involved other senior members of Venezuela's government as well, such as Tarek El Aissami and José David Cabello, Diosdado's brother.

On 18 May 2018, the Office of Foreign Assets Control (OFAC) of the United States Department of the Treasury placed sanctions in effect against Cabello, his wife, his brother and his "testaferro" (frontman) Rafael Sarria. OFAC stated that Cabello and others used their power within the Bolivarian government "to personally profit from extortion, money laundering, and embezzlement", with Cabello allegedly directing drug trafficking activities with Vice President of Venezuela, Tareck El Aissami while dividing profits with President Nicolás Maduro. The Office also stated that Cabello would use public information to track wealth individuals who were potentially drug trafficking and steal their drugs and property in order to get rid of potential competition.

Tareck El Aissami 
Tareck El Aissami was sanctioned by the US Treasury Department on 13 February 2017 under the Foreign Narcotics Kingpin Designation Act after being accused of facilitating drug shipments from Venezuela to Mexico and the United States, freezing tens of millions of dollars of assets purportedly under El Aissami's control.

Néstor Reverol 
Head of the Bolivarian National Guard, Néstor Reverol, has been indicted by the United States government in August 2016 of assisting with drug trafficking in Venezuela. Reverol allegedly tipped off traffickers, cancelled investigations and released those involved in drug shipments.

Hugo Carvajal
Hugo Carvajal is allegedly one of the leaders of the Cartel of the Suns. On July 22, 2014, Hugo Carvajal, former head of Venezuelan military-intelligence, was detained in Aruba, despite having been admitted on a diplomatic passport and being named consul general to Aruba in January. The arrest was carried out following a formal request by the U.S. government, which accuses Carvajal of ties to drug trafficking and to the FARC guerrilla group. On 27 July 2014, Carvajal was released after authorities decided he had diplomatic immunity, but was also considered persona non grata.  On march of 2020, after a strategic 10 million dollar bounty imposed on Hugo Carvajal and other Venezuelan narcoterrorists, he decided to surrender to the U.S. Possibly to cut a deal with information on bigger supposedly corrupt governmental officials and narcoterrorists that are affiliated with Maduro's government. Not to mention Maduro himself has a 15 million dollar bounty.

Yazenky Lamas

Yazenky Lamas, former pilot to First Lady Cilia Flores, was extradited to the United States from Colombia, having allegedly provided air traffic codes to allow planes carrying cocaine to impersonate commercial flights. Venezuela President Nicolás Maduro reportedly asked Colombian Defense Minister Luis Carlos Villegas Echeverri to reject the request for extradition. Lamas has been linked to hundreds of drug flights operated in Venezuela.

Others 
Other officials that are possibly involved with the Cartel of the Suns include:

Allies

FARC

In 2005, all branches of the National Bolivarian Armed Forces of Venezuela were given the duty to combat drug trafficking in Venezuela, granting data once held only by the Bolivarian National Guard to the army, navy and air force. Mildred Camero, former anti-drug official of the Chávez government, stated that this data created competition within the ranks of the military who fought to make deals with the FARC to actively partake in drug trafficking.

Authorities in Colombia stated that through laptops they had seized on a raid against Raul Reyes in 2007, they found documents purporting to show that Hugo Chávez offered payments of as much as $300 million to the FARC "among other financial and political ties that date back years" and documents showing the FARC rebels sought Venezuelan assistance in acquiring surface-to-air missiles, alleging that Chavez met personally with FARC rebel leaders. According to Interpol, the files found by Colombian forces were considered to be authentic. In 2008, the United States Department of Treasury accused two senior Venezuelan government officials and one former official of providing material assistance for drug-trafficking operations carried out by the FARC guerrilla group in Colombia.

However, independent analyses of the documents by some U.S. academics and journalists have challenged the Colombian interpretation of the documents, accusing the Colombian government of exaggerating their contents. In 2008, the Secretary General of the Organization of American States, Jose Miguel Insulza, testified before the U.S. Congress that "there are no evidences" that Venezuela is supporting "terrorist groups", including the FARC. Three years later in 2011, the International Institute for Strategic Studies (IISS) concluded that Chavez's government funded FARC's Caracas office and granted it access to intelligence services. Venezuelan diplomats denounced the IISS' findings saying that they had "basic inaccuracies".

Nevertheless, as of 2018, FARC dissidents who left FARC when it disbanded in 2017 still operate within Venezuela with virtual impunity. These dissident forces, with armed personnel numbering up to 2,500 individuals, allegedly still cooperate with the Cartel of the Suns.

See also
 Deep state
 Controversies surrounding Army of the Guardians of the Islamic Revolution
 Illegal drug trade in Colombia
 Narcosobrinos affair
 Susurluk scandal

References

Drug cartels in Venezuela
Military of Venezuela
Secret societies related to organized crime
Corruption in Venezuela
Crisis in Venezuela